Edward John Pollock (born 10 July 1995) is an English cricketer. He made his Twenty20 cricket debut for Warwickshire in the 2017 NatWest t20 Blast on 23 July 2017. He made his List A debut for Warwickshire in the 2018 Royal London One-Day Cup on 17 May 2018. In July 2021, in the 2021 Royal London One-Day Cup, Pollock scored his first century in List A cricket. In April 2022, in the opening round of matches in the 2022 County Championship, Pollock scored his maiden century in first-class cricket, with 112 runs against Leicestershire.

References

External links
 
 Ed Pollock at Warwickshire County Cricket Club

1995 births
Living people
English cricketers
Herefordshire cricketers
Durham MCCU cricketers
Alumni of Collingwood College, Durham
Warwickshire cricketers
Worcestershire cricketers
Sportspeople from High Wycombe